Germany competed at the 2017 World Championships in Athletics in London, Great Britain, from 4–13 August 2017.

Medalists

Results

Men
Track and road events

Field events

Combined events – Decathlon

Women
Track and road events

* – Indicates the athlete competed in preliminaries but not the final

Field events

Combined events – Heptathlon

References

2017
Nations at the 2017 World Championships in Athletics
World Championships in Athletics